The state elections Roraima in 2010 happened on October 3 as part of general elections that year in Brazil. At this time, elections were held in all 26 Brazilian states and the Federal District. Citizens eligible to vote elected the president, the governor and two senators per state, plus state and federal deputies. Since no presidential candidate, and governor of Rondônia received more middle of the valid votes, a runoff is carried out in the 31 October at the presidential election second round was between Rousseff's (PT) and José Serra (PSDB), with victory Dilma; already in the government of Rondonia was among Neudo Campos and Anchieta in Anchieta victory. Under the Federal Constitution, the President and the governors are directly elected for a term of four years, with a limit of two terms, so the president Luiz Inacio Lula da Silva was unable to stand, since he was elected in 2002 and reelected in 2006. Already Anchieta, elected in 2006, tried a re-election and won it.

References

2010 Brazilian gubernatorial elections
Roraima gubernatorial elections
October 2010 events in South America